Staw Noakowski-Kolonia  is a village in the administrative district of Gmina Nielisz, within Zamość County, Lublin Voivodeship, in eastern Poland.

References

Staw Noakowski-Kolonia